Birger Ivar "Bigge" Holmqvist (28 December 1900 – 9 April 1989) was a Swedish ice hockey and bandy player. He competed in the 1924 and 1928 Winter Olympics and won a silver medal in 1928. His team finished fourth in 1924, but he was named the best European player of the tournament. Between 1922 and 1928 Holmqvist played 30 international matches and scored 30 goals.

Holmqvist won Swedish ice hockey titles in 1922, 1924, 1927 and 1928 and bandy titles in 1925 and 1927 with IK Göta. Between 1921 and 1926 he also played for Berliner SC and won the 1924 Spengler Cup and German titles in 1921 and 1923–26.

References

External links

1900 births
1989 deaths
Ice hockey players at the 1924 Winter Olympics
Ice hockey players at the 1928 Winter Olympics
Olympic ice hockey players of Sweden
Olympic silver medalists for Sweden
Swedish bandy players
Olympic medalists in ice hockey
Medalists at the 1928 Winter Olympics
IK Göta Bandy players
IK Göta Ishockey players
Ice hockey people from Stockholm